The Nyagak is a river of West Nile, Northern Uganda.

Location
The Nyagak river runs through Zombo District and Arua District. It is a tributary of the Ora River, which it joins east of the town of Okollo.

Hydropower
Several hydropower developments are located on the Nyagak river :
Nyagak Power Station
Nyagak II Power Station
Nyagak III Power Station

Rivers of Uganda